Clarice Navarro  is a politician and former state representative from Pueblo, Colorado. First elected in November 2012, Navarro served in the state house from January, 2013 until she resigned in November, 2017 to take a job in the Trump administration. She currently works in the office of Congresswoman Lauren Boebert.

Education 
Navarro attended Otero Junior College. Navarro earned a Bachelor of Arts degree in Business Management from National American University.

Career 
Navarro was an educator at Colorado Department of Corrections and Las Animas High School. In 2003, Navarro was a business teacher until 2007.

Elections
2012 When Republican Representative Keith Swerdfeger left the Legislature and left the District 47 seat open, Navarro was unopposed for the June 26, 2012 Republican Primary, winning with 4,067 votes, and won the November 6, 2012 General election with 18,215 votes (51.7%) against Democratic nominee Netto Rodosevich.
In 2014, Representative Navarro won the general election with 18,358 votes (64.6%).
In 2016, Representative Navarro won the general election with 21,714 votes (57.7%).

Personal life 
Navarro is married and she has two children. Navarro and her family are from Las Animas, Colorado.

References

External links
New State House website
Official page at the Colorado General Assembly
Campaign site

Place of birth missing (living people)
Year of birth missing (living people)
Living people
Hispanic and Latino American state legislators in Colorado
Hispanic and Latino American women in politics
Republican Party members of the Colorado House of Representatives
People from Bent County, Colorado
Women state legislators in Colorado
People from Pueblo, Colorado
21st-century American politicians
21st-century American women politicians